Liliane Patricia Zoe Klein (born July 26, 1980) is an American theatre and television actress, singer, and plus-size model.

Klein was born in New Hyde Park, New York. She graduated from Boston University College of Fine Arts, School of Theatre Arts in 2002 with her BFA cum laude in Acting. She is known for her roles as Helen in Neil LaBute's Fat Pig, and as Terry the Turtle in the PBS television series Kid Fitness. She became a plus-size model in 2002. She is a company member of Connecticut Free Shakespeare as well as a member of The Players. She is the vocal guide for Rose on the Stage Stars karaoke CD of Gypsy.

Awards and nominations
In 2006 she was nominated for a New York Innovative Theatre Award at the 2nd Annual New York Innovative Theatre Awards for Best Actress for her portrayal of Rosemary Clooney in I Wanna Be Rosie at La MaMa Experimental Theatre Club. In 2007 she was nominated for an Elliot Norton Award at the 25th Annual Elliot Norton Awards for Outstanding Actress for her portrayal of Helen in Neil LaBute's Fat Pig in both the Bay Area and New England premieres of the play.

In 2008 she was nominated for an IRNE Award for Best Actress Drama for her portrayal of Helen in Neil LaBute's, Fat Pig (2004). In 2010 she was nominated for a Bay Area Theatre Critics Circle (BATCC) Award for her portrayal of Helen in Neil LaBute's Fat Pig (2009).

Stage appearances
Scrooge, The Musical (2002) (Lincoln Center/National Tour) – Charwoman/Mrs. Fezziwig
Narrative Invtervention (2002) (HERE Arts Center; Off-Off-Broadway) – Ensemble
Smokey Joe's Cafe (2004) (Ivoryton Playhouse) – Self
The Greeks (2004) Manhattan Ensemble Theatre – Eucleia
Titanic (2004 musical national tour of US/Canada) – Alice Beane
As You Like It (2005) (Connecticut Free Shakespeare) – Audrey
I Wanna Be Rosie (2005) (La MaMa; Off-Off-Broadway) – Rosemary Clooney
Cyrano de Bergerac (2006; Connecticut Free Shakespeare) – Duena
Me and My Girl (2006) (Musicals Tonight!; Off-Off-Broadway)– Mrs. Brown
Fat Pig (2007) (SpeakEasy Stage Company, Boston Center for the Arts) – Helen
Love's Labour's Lost (2007) (Connecticut Free Shakespeare) – Boyet
A Streetcar Named Desire (2008) (Worcester Foothills Theatre) – Eunice Hubbell
On the Town (2008; Staten Island Philharmonic) – Diana Dream
The Cabaret Girl (2009) (Musicals Tonight!; Off-Off-Broadway) – Miss Simmons
A Midsummer Night's Dream (2009) (Connecticut Free Shakespeare) – Snout
Fat Pig (2009) (Aurora Theatre Company, Berkeley, California) – Helen
The Most Ridiculous Thing You Ever Hoid (2010) (Urban Stages/New York Musical Theatre Festival) (Off-Broadway) – Mrs. Van Regal/Curley Sue

Filmography
 Kid Fitness – Terry the Turtle – (8 episodes, 2005–2007)
 Conviction – Law Office Client (1 episode, 2006)
 Shut Up and Sing (2006/I) – Wedding Guest
 Traveler – Museum patron (1 episode, 2007)
 Z Rock – Slump Buster (1 episode, 2008)
 Ugly Betty – Assistant Casting Director (1 episode, 2008)

Discography
 Gypsy, Stage Stars Karaoke CD – Rose
 Funny Girl, Stage Stars Karaoke CD – Ensemble

External links
 Liliane Klein, Internet Movie Database
 Liliane Klein, Film.com
 Liliane Klein interview, The Boston Globe
 Liliane Klein review, The Boston Globe
 Liliane Klein review, San Francisco Chronicle

References

1980 births
Actresses from New York (state)
American musical theatre actresses
American stage actresses
American television actresses
Boston University College of Fine Arts alumni
Living people
People from New Hyde Park, New York
Plus-size models
Singers from New York (state)
21st-century American women